The following list is of the results of the Russia national rugby league team. Russia played their first match in 1991 as the Soviet Union, and played four more matches as the Commonwealth of Independent States (CIS).

Results

1990s

2000s

2010s

External links 

 Russia results – Rugby League Project

Russia national rugby league team
Rugby league records and statistics